William McDougall may refer to:

William McDougall (politician, born 1822) (1822–1905), Canadian lawyer and politician from Ontario
William McDougall (Nova Scotia politician) (1816–1886), Canadian shipbuilder and politician from Nova Scotia
William McDougall (Quebec politician) (1831–1886), Canadian lawyer, judge and politician from Quebec
William McDougall (psychologist) (1871–1938), British psychologist and author
William Currie McDougall (1840-1920) Scottish minister and poet, central to the Coatbridge Free Church Scandal
Bill McDougall (born 1966), Canadian ice hockey player

See also
William MacDougall (born 1944), Canadian politician
William Dugald MacDougall, United States Navy admiral|
William MacDougal, supposed full name of Groundskeeper Willie in The Simpsons television show